Sharad Singh Bhandari is a Nepalese Revolutionary politician, belonging to the Communist Party Nepal(Maoist Centre). In the 2008 Constituent Assembly election he was elected from the Achham-2 constituency, winning 17976 votes.

References

Living people
Year of birth missing (living people)
People from Achham District

Members of the 1st Nepalese Constituent Assembly
Communist Party of Nepal (Maoist Centre) politicians